Jefferson Parish Hospital District No. 2 v. Hyde, 466 U.S. 2 (1984), was a United States Supreme Court case in which the Court held the analysis of the tying issue must focus on the hospital's sale of services to its patients, rather than its contractual arrangements with the providers of anesthesiological services. 

In making that analysis, consideration must be given to whether petitioners are selling two separate products that may be tied together, and, if so, whether they have used their market power to force their patients to accept the tying arrangement. It set a permissive precedent in antitrust law, as some viewed tying as always anticompetitive.

Rationale 

Any inquiry into the validity of a tying arrangement must focus on the market or markets in which the two products are sold, for that is where the anticompetitive forcing has its impact. Thus, in this case, the analysis of the tying issue must focus on the hospital's sale of services to its patients, rather than its contractual arrangements with the providers of anesthesiological services. In making that analysis, consideration must be given to whether petitioners are selling two separate products that may be tied together, and, if so, whether they have used their market power to force their patients to accept the tying arrangement.

There is no evidence that the price, quality, or supply or demand for either the "tying product" or the "tied product" has been adversely affected by the exclusive contract, and no showing that the market as a whole has been affected at all by the contract. The case invokes the Clayton Antitrust Act of 1914, a notable piece of antitrust legislation.

References

External links 
 

United States Supreme Court cases
United States Supreme Court cases of the Burger Court
United States antitrust case law
Jefferson Parish, Louisiana
Hospitals in Louisiana
1984 in United States case law